Truus van der Plaat is a retired Dutch track and road cyclist who was active between 1970 and 1980. She won a silver medal in the sprint at the 1979 world championships.

References

Living people
Dutch female cyclists
People from Geldermalsen
Cyclists from Gelderland
Year of birth missing (living people)